The Popular Democratic Union (or UDP) is a Marxist political movement in Portugal. The UDP transformed itself into a political association at its 15th congress due to its merger with other left-wing parties in the Left Bloc.

History
The party was founded in December 1974 as a common mass front of the Committee for Support to the Reconstruction of the Party (Marxist–Leninist) (CARP(ML)), Revolutionary Marxist–Leninist Unity (URML) and Revolutionary Communist Committees (Marxist–Leninist). UDP ran lists in the first free election in Portugal in 1975, and elected one MP in that election. UDP also ran in the subsequent elections until 1983. After that it ran integrated in the electoral lists of the Portuguese Communist Party until 1991.

In 1998 it became part of the Left Bloc after a merger with other small left-wing parties and movements, the Revolutionary Socialist Party, Politics XXI and the Left Revolutionary Front.

The current president of People's Democratic Union is Joana Mortágua (2010), 24 years old. Joana Mortágua was Left Bloc candidate in the national legislative elections of 2009, electoral district of Évora and is member of the current Political Commission of Left Bloc.

References

External links
Official website

1974 establishments in Portugal
2005 disestablishments in Portugal
Defunct socialist parties in Portugal
Left Bloc (Portugal)
Left-wing parties
Political parties disestablished in 2005
Political parties established in 1974